Carman Lapointe (born 1951, in Canada) was Under-Secretary-General for the United Nations Office of Internal Oversight Services (OIOS) from 2010 to 2015.

Prior to joining the UN she was Auditor General for the World Bank Group headquartered in Washington, DC. She has also served as an auditor for Bank of Canada and corporate auditor for Canada Post, among others.  She was the first woman Chairperson of The Institute of Internal Auditors in 1995.

References

External links 
UN Biography Carman L. Lapointe
UN Office of Internal Oversight Services

1951 births
Living people
Canadian diplomats
People from Virden, Manitoba
Under-Secretaries-General of the United Nations
Canadian women diplomats
Canadian officials of the United Nations